Northwest Regional Airport may refer to:

 Northwest Regional Airport (Texas) in Roanoke, Texas, United States
 Northwest Regional Airport (British Columbia) between Terrace and Kitimat, British Columbia, Canada

See also 
 Northwest Alabama Regional Airport in Muscle Shoals, Alabama, United States
 Northwest Arkansas Regional Airport in Fayetteville/Springdale, Arkansas, United States
 Northwest Missouri Regional Airport in Maryville, Missouri, United States